The Maruti Suzuki Zen is a 5-door hatchback produced and sold in India by Suzuki's Indian subsidiary Maruti Suzuki from 1993 until 2006; it is a widened version of the Suzuki Cervo Mode. The word "ZEN" is an acronym standing for Zero Engine Noise. It also stands for the Japanese word "Zen" which means 'Complete'. The Indian-built Zen was also exported to other countries as the Suzuki Alto.

First generation
Based on the Suzuki Cervo, the first generation Maruti Suzuki Zen was introduced on 21 May 1993 (MH410). While it looks very similar to the Cervo Mode, it has a lot of unique sheetmetal as it is ten centimeters longer and ten wider. In Europe and many other export markets, the car sold as the Suzuki Alto. Zen used an all aluminium engine Suzuki G10B engine which produced 50 BHP of power at around 6500 RPM. The engine head &  spares are exactly identical to the Zen Carburettor MH410 model Indian version slightly detuned.

There was a minor facelift in 1997 with body coloured bumpers. In 1999, Zen Classic with retro looking front and rear was launched, but was soon discontinued due to lack of demand.

In 2000, Maruti introduced a 16 valve MPFI engine with 4 valves per cylinder. Power output went up by 10 HP to 60 BHP. Its cost (of the Zen LX model) was around Rs 3,40,000 in India. A diesel version of Zen was launched in 1998 with the Peugeot's TUD5 (PSA TU engine) engine. This model did not sell well and was discontinued. In 2004 Zen underwent a facelift with new body which was called Zen Tiger.

The Zen underwent a facelift in 2003. A three-door version of the Zen in VXi segment was launched, priced at 5.0 Lakh (ex-showroom, New Delhi). It was only available in Black (Zen Carbon) 300 nos or Silver (Zen Steel) 300 nos, cars. In 2006 the second generation (Zen Tiger) was discontinued.

Second generation
The second generation Maruti Suzuki Zen, called the Zen Estilo was introduced in December 2006 as a part of Maruti Suzuki's Indian market strategy to launch a new car annually for the next five years. The Zen Estilo had the same engine and chassis as the Maruti Wagon R; both being based on the Suzuki MR Wagon (Nissan Moco). The pricing was also nearly the same as the Wagon R. The Maruti Suzuki Alto (model prior to Alto K10), Wagon R (till Aug 2010) and the new Zen Estilo all shared the same chassis. In 2009, along with a minor facelift, Maruti Suzuki dropped the Zen branding from the name.

Reception 
The Zen was a very successful model for Maruti Suzuki both in India and abroad. It was called India's first world car and was exported to Europe as early as 1994. Besides being exported to Europe from 1994 to 2004, it has also been exported to several other countries. The Zen quickly became a hit with the Indian Racing Scene with highly modified versions of the 993 cc G10B engine topping 100+ Bhp.

The Zen was the first fun to drive hatchback in the Indian market. It was a driver oriented car with low seating and go kart like handling. The car was very reliable and it is possible to find many good examples of Zen still in use. The Zen still commands a relatively high resale value on the used car market.

Technical specifications

Trim levels at launch badged as MH410 later as LX, LXi, VXi and D,Di
The Maruti Suzuki Zen has a four-cylinder in-line all aluminium engine mounted transverse and using Carburetor/MPFI Carburetor Valvetrain is 2 Valves/Cylinder SOHC with Displacement of 993CC  Max Power is 50bhp at 6500rpm and Maximun Torque 7.2 kgm at 4500rpm.
Compression Ratio 8:8:1
MPFI valvetrain is 4 valves/cyl, SOHC with a displacement of 993 cc.
It has a 5 speed manual transmission.

 Bore x Stroke:  x  Comp Ratio: 9.4 (+/- 0.2):1Drivetrain
 Front brakes: 	 disc Rear:	 drum Type:	Hydraulic, vacuum assisted Wheels F/R: 4Jx13,4.5Jx13 (carbon/steel) and 4Jx12” Tyres:	145/70/R13 (Earlier Petrol and Diesel variant) and 145/80/R12 (Petrol variant) In Zen 155/65/13, Measurements are best to upsize tyres in petrol and diesel variant too (not touches the body of car from top while there is load in car and sides while turning the steering and there is no need to make changes in suspension system) and not effects the mileage
 Steering:	Rack and pinion, First EPS from Maruti appeared in Zen.Electric Power assist Turning circle dial:	 Turns lock to lock:	9.8 Suspension:  Front: 	Independent, MacPherson strut, coil springs Rear:	3 link rigid axle with isolated trailing arm, coil spring and gas filled shock absorbers  General data Kerb weight:	 Wheelbase:	 Track (F/R)	1335/1305 mm L/W/H:	3465/1495/1405 mm Ground clearance:	 Accommodation Seating capacity:	5 Head Room, F/R	952/930 mm Leg room, F max/min	1170/990 mm Leg room, R max/min	750/610 mm Knee room, F max/min	750/610 mm Knee room, R max/min	840/650 mm Shoulder space	  Fuel economy Overall:+	14 kmpl City:	12.0 kmpl ( with AC ) Highway:	16.21 kmpl Worst:	10.9 kmpl Fuel Tank Capacity:	35 litres Range:	528.5 km + is 75% city driving and 25% highway driving   Braking Minimum Stopping Distance  From 100 km/h	54.33 m/3.73 s From 80 km/h	28.11 m/2.59 s

See also
Maruti Suzuki Zen Estilo

References

External links
 Official Maruti Suzuki Zen India Page
 Exports of Maruti Suzuki Cars
 Businessworld on the old Zen and the new Zen Estilo

Zen
OEM Suzuki vehicles
Cars introduced in 1993
2000s cars
Front-wheel-drive vehicles
Hatchbacks